Kuta Pasee Football Club (simply known as Kuta Pasee) is an Indonesian football club based in Lhokseumawe, Aceh. They currently compete in the Liga 3 and their homeground is PT Arun Stadium.

References

External links
Kuta Pasee FC Instagram

 Lhokseumawe
Football clubs in Indonesia
Football clubs in Aceh
Association football clubs established in 2015
2015 establishments in Indonesia